Iago López Carracedo (born 6 April 1999) is a Spanish professional footballer who plays as a right back for AD Alcorcón.

Club career
López was born in Lugo, Galicia, and represented CD Lugo and Deportivo de La Coruña as a youth. He made his senior debut with the latter's reserves on 7 May 2017, starting in a 2–1 Tercera División away win against CD As Pontes.

On 11 July 2018, after finishing his formation, López moved to Girona FC and was assigned to the farm team in Segunda División B. On 19 August of the following year, he was loaned to UD Logroñés still in the third division, as Girona's affiliation with Peralada ended.

López became a regular starter during the campaign, contributing with one goal in 19 appearances as his side achieved promotion to Segunda División. On 28 August 2020, his loan at UDL was extended for a further year.

López made his professional debut on 12 September 2020, starting in a 0–1 away loss against Sporting de Gijón. On 13 July of the following year, after Logroñés' relegation, he signed a permanent two-year deal with CD Mirandés also in the second tier.

On 29 July 2022, López moved to AD Alcorcón, freshly relegated to Primera Federación.

References

External links

1999 births
Living people
Footballers from Lugo
Spanish footballers
Association football defenders
Segunda División players
Segunda División B players
Tercera División players
Deportivo Fabril players
CF Peralada players
Girona FC players
UD Logroñés players
CD Mirandés footballers
AD Alcorcón footballers